Events in the year 2023 in China.

Incumbents

Paramount leader

Head of state

Head of government

National legislature

Political advisory

Supervision commission

Events
 8 January - 17 people were killed and 22 others injured when a truck hit a funeral procession in Nanchang County, Jiangxi.
 11 January - Five people were killed and 13 others injured when a man rammed his vehicle into a crowd in Guangzhou, Guangdong.
 17 January - An avalanche struck in Nyingchi, Tibet, killing 28 people.
 4 February - At least 16 people were killed and 66 others were injured in a multiple-vehicle collision along a highway in Changsha, Hunan.
 12 February - 2023 Shandong high-altitude object: China says that it has detected an unidentified flying object over the Yellow Sea, and warns that it is prepared to shoot down the object. The Qingdao Marine Development Bureau issues an alert to fishermen in the waters to be "on alert" and "avoid risks".
22 February - At least two people are killed and more than 50 others are reported missing following a collapse at a coal mine in Alxa League, Inner Mongolia.

Deaths 
 1 January -
 Wei Lian, 77, film director.
 Fan Weitang, 87, mining engineer.
 Zhu Zushou, 77, diplomat, ambassador to Hungary (2003–2007) and the Netherlands (2001–2003).
 Wang Hao, 92, military officer.
2 January -
John Huo Cheng, 96, Roman Catholic prelate.
Hu Fuming, 87, scholar and politician.
Wang Zhiliang, 94, translator.
3 January - 
Zhao Qiguo, 92, soil scientist, member of the Chinese Academy of Sciences.
Zhou Lingzhao, 103, painter.
4 January -
Wu Sheng, 88, nuclear engineer, member of the Chinese Academy of Engineering.
Xu Mi, 85, nuclear engineer, member of the Chinese Academy of Engineering.
Ge Xiurun, 88, engineer, member of the Chinese Academy of Engineering.
Lu Xiyan, 94, organic scientist, member of the Chinese Academy of Sciences.
5 January - Yang Fuyu, 95, biochemist, member of the Chinese Academy of Sciences.
8 January - Wu Tao, 82, diplomat, ambassador to Portugal (1992–1994), Russia (1998–2001) and Australia (2001–2003).
9 January - Zhang Jinlin, 86, engineer, member of the Chinese Academy of Engineering.
10 January - He Ping, 65, film director (Swordsmen in Double Flag Town, Sun Valley, Warriors of Heaven and Earth).
13 January - Mao Zhi, 90, engineer, member of the Chinese Academy of Engineering.
14 January - Qian Yitai, 82, chemist, member of the Chinese Academy of Sciences.
15 January - Chen Qizhi, 97, military officer and academic administrator, deputy (1975–1983) and president of NUDT (1990–1994).
16 January - Guo Hong'an, 79, translator.
17 January - Liang Jincai, 95, aerospace engineer, member of the Chinese Academy of Engineering.
20 January -
Fang Zhiyuan, 83, engineer, member of the Chinese Academy of Engineering.
He Haoju, 100, politician, deputy (1983–1998).
23 January - Hu Guangzhen, 95, electronic engineer, member of the Chinese Academy of Engineering.
24 January - Li Zhao, 82, landmine expert, member of the Chinese Academy of Engineering.
26 January - Wang Wei, 85, physicist, member of the Chinese Academy of Sciences.
27 January -
Li Wenjun, 92, translator.
Yang Yi, 103, literary translator.
30 January - Ouyang Pingkai, 77, engineer and academic administrator, president of Nanjing Tech University (2001–2012) and member of the Chinese Academy of Engineering.
5 February -
Hsing Yun, 95, Buddhist monk, founder of Fo Guang Shan and Buddha's Light International Association.
Wu Zhongru, 83, hydraulic engineer, member of the Chinese Academy of Engineering.
13 February - Shi Zhongci, 89, mathematician, member of the Chinese Academy of Sciences.

See also

Country overviews 
 History of China
 History of modern China
 Outline of China
 Government of China
 Politics of China
 Timeline of Chinese history
 Years in China

References

Links 
 

 
China
China
2020s in China
Years of the 21st century in China